Shuko Aoyama and Yang Zhaoxuan were the defending champions, but Yang chose not to participate. Aoyama played alongside Duan Yingying, but lost in the semifinals to Eri Hozumi and Zhang Shuai.

Hozumi and Zhang went on to win the title, defeating Miyu Kato and Makoto Ninomiya in the final, 6–2, 6–4.

Seeds

Draw

Draw

References
Main Draw

Japan Women's Open - Doubles
2018 Doubles
2018 Japan Women's Open